Uzu, UZU or Üzü may refer to:

Music
 UZU, a 2013 album by Yamantaka // Sonic Titan
 "Uzu" (song), 2003, by Porno Graffitti

Places
 Uzu Hotel, Benghazi, Libya
 Two villages in Azerbaijan:
Çay Üzü
Dağ Üzü

See also
 Üzü (disambiguation)
 Ozu (disambiguation)
 Uzo (disambiguation)
 
 Yuzu, a fruit